The J-integral represents a way to calculate the strain energy release rate, or work (energy) per unit fracture surface area, in a material. The theoretical concept of J-integral was developed in 1967 by G. P. Cherepanov and independently in 1968 by James R. Rice, who showed that an energetic contour path integral (called J) was independent of the path around a crack.

Experimental methods were developed using the integral that allowed the measurement of critical fracture properties in sample sizes that are too small for Linear Elastic Fracture Mechanics (LEFM) to be valid.  These experiments allow the determination of fracture toughness from the critical value of fracture energy JIc, which defines the point at which large-scale plastic yielding during propagation takes place under mode I loading.

The J-integral is equal to the strain energy release rate for a crack in a body subjected to monotonic loading.  This is generally true, under quasistatic conditions, only for linear elastic materials. For materials that experience small-scale yielding at the crack tip, J can be used to compute the energy release rate under special circumstances such as monotonic loading in mode III (antiplane shear).  The strain energy release rate can also be computed from J for pure power-law hardening plastic materials that undergo small-scale yielding at the crack tip.

The quantity J is not path-independent for monotonic mode I and mode II loading of elastic-plastic materials, so only a contour very close to the crack tip gives the energy release rate.  Also, Rice showed that J is path-independent in plastic materials when there is no non-proportional loading. Unloading is a special case of this, but non-proportional plastic loading also invalidates the path-independence. Such non-proportional loading is the reason for the path-dependence for the in-plane loading modes on elastic-plastic materials.

Two-dimensional J-integral 

The two-dimensional J-integral was originally defined as (see Figure 1 for an illustration)

where W(x1,x2) is the strain energy density, x1,x2 are the coordinate directions, t = [σ]n is the surface traction vector, n is the normal to the curve Γ, [σ] is the Cauchy stress tensor, and u is the displacement vector.  The strain energy density is given by

The J-integral around a crack tip is frequently expressed in a more general form (and in index notation) as 
 
Using Green's theorem we can show that this integral is zero when the boundary  is closed and encloses a region that contains no singularities and is simply connected.  If the faces of the crack do not have any surface tractions on them then the J-integral is also path independent.

Rice also showed that the value of the J-integral represents the energy release rate for planar crack growth.
The J-integral was developed because of the difficulties involved in computing the stress close to a crack in a nonlinear elastic or elastic-plastic material.  Rice showed that if monotonic loading was assumed (without any plastic unloading) then the J-integral could be used to compute the energy release rate of plastic materials too.

{| class="toccolours collapsible collapsed" width="80%" style="text-align:left"
!Proof that the J-integral is zero over a closed path
|-

We can write this as

From Green's theorem (or the two-dimensional divergence theorem) we have

Using this result we can express  as

where  is the area enclosed by the contour .  Now, if there are no body forces present, equilibrium (conservation of linear momentum) requires that

Also,

Therefore,

From the balance of angular momentum we have .  Hence, 

The J-integral may then be written as

Now, for an elastic material the stress can be derived from the stored energy function  using 

Then, if the elastic modulus tensor is homogeneous, using the chain rule of differentiation,

Therefore, we have  for a closed contour enclosing a simply connected region without any elastic inhomogeneity, such as voids and cracks.
|}

{| class="toccolours collapsible collapsed" width="80%" style="text-align:left"
!Proof that the J-integral is path-independent
|-
|
Consider the contour .  Since this contour is closed and encloses a simply connected region, the J-integral around the contour is zero, i.e.

assuming that counterclockwise integrals around the crack tip have positive sign.  Now, since the crack surfaces are parallel to the  axis, the normal component  on these surfaces.  Also, since the crack surfaces are traction free, .  Therefore,

Therefore,

and the J-integral is path independent.
|}

J-integral and fracture toughness

For isotropic, perfectly brittle, linear elastic materials, the J-integral can be directly related to the fracture toughness if the crack extends straight ahead with respect to its original orientation.

For plane strain, under Mode I loading conditions, this relation is

where  is the critical strain energy release rate,  is the fracture toughness in Mode I loading,  is the Poisson's ratio, and E is the Young's modulus of the material.

For Mode II loading, the relation between the J-integral and the mode II fracture toughness is

For Mode III loading, the relation is

Elastic-plastic materials and the HRR solution 

Hutchinson, Rice and Rosengren  subsequently showed that J characterizes the singular stress and strain fields at the tip of a crack in nonlinear (power law hardening) elastic-plastic materials where the size of the plastic zone is small compared with the crack length.  Hutchinson used a material constitutive law of the form suggested by W. Ramberg and W. Osgood:

where σ is the stress in uniaxial tension, σy is a yield stress, ε is the strain,  and εy = σy/E is the corresponding yield strain.  The quantity E is the elastic  Young's modulus of the material.  The model is parametrized by α, a dimensionless constant characteristic of the material, and n, the coefficient of work hardening.  This model is applicable only to situations where the stress increases monotonically, the stress components remain approximately in the same ratios as loading progresses (proportional loading), and there is no unloading.

If a far-field tensile stress σfar is applied to the body shown in the adjacent figure, the J-integral around the path Γ1 (chosen to be completely inside the elastic zone) is given by

Since the total integral around the crack vanishes and the contributions along the surface of the crack are zero, we have

If the path Γ2 is chosen such that it is inside the fully plastic domain, Hutchinson showed that

where K is a stress amplitude, (r,θ) is a polar coordinate system with origin at the crack tip, s is a constant determined from an asymptotic expansion of the stress field around the crack, and I is a dimensionless integral.  The relation between the J-integrals around  Γ1 and  Γ2 leads to the constraint

and an expression for K in terms of the far-field stress

where β = 1 for plane stress and β = 1 − ν2 for plane strain (ν is the Poisson's ratio).

The asymptotic expansion of the stress field and the above ideas can be used to determine the stress and strain fields in terms of the J-integral:

These expressions indicate that J can be interpreted as a plastic analog to the stress intensity factor (K) that is used in linear elastic fracture mechanics, i.e., we can use a criterion such as J > JIc as a crack growth criterion.

See also
 Fracture toughness
 Toughness
 Fracture mechanics
 Stress intensity factor
 Nature of the slip band local field

References

External links
 J. R. Rice, "A Path Independent Integral and the Approximate Analysis of Strain Concentration by Notches and Cracks", Journal of Applied Mechanics, 35, 1968, pp. 379–386.
 Van Vliet, Krystyn J. (2006); "3.032 Mechanical Behavior of Materials", 
 X. Chen (2014), "Path-Independent Integral", In: Encyclopedia of Thermal Stresses, edited by  R. B. Hetnarski, Springer, .
Nonlinear Fracture Mechanics Notes by Prof. John Hutchinson (from Harvard University)
Notes on Fracture of Thin Films and Multilayers by Prof. John Hutchinson (from Harvard University)
Mixed mode cracking in layered materials by Profs. John Hutchinson and Zhigang Suo (from Harvard University)
Fracture Mechanics by Piet Schreurs (from TU Eindhoven, The Netherlands)
Introduction to Fracture Mechanics by Dr. C. H. Wang (DSTO - Australia)
Fracture mechanics course notes by Prof. Rui Huang (from Univ. of Texas at Austin)
HRR solutions by Ludovic Noels (University of Liege)

Failure
Solid mechanics
Materials testing
Mechanics
Fracture mechanics